Arta Dobroshi (born 2 October 1980) is a Kosovo-Albanian actress and producer. Dobroshi is the first Kosovan actress to walk the red carpet at the Cannes Film Festival, the Berlin International Film Festival and the Sundance Film Festival and be nominated for the European Film Award. Dobroshi is a former refugee and now a UN Champion and Goodwill Ambassador.

Early life
Arta Dobroshi was born in Pristina, to Kosovo Albanian parents. She has been studying the performing arts since elementary school and attended the Academy of Arts acting and drama course in Pristina for four years. She starred in many short films and theatre plays whilst a student there. When Arta was fifteen, she went on a student exchange program to North Carolina, where she starred in drama plays. Dobroshi has a strong work ethic, known to rehearse for a role eight hours or more a day. After her first year at the academy, the Kosovo War escalated and Dobroshi's grandparents were imprisoned by Serbian authorities for trying to open an Albanian-language university. In 1999, Serbian soldiers stormed a bar in Pristina and opened fire, killing almost all the customers, including one of Dobroshi's professors at the Pristina Academy of Arts and an actress with whom she was friends. Another friend survived a bullet wound to the head. During this period, Dobroshi was in Macedonia where she was helping set up a refugee camp for the International Medical Corps, working with people who had been severely traumatized by the war. When Serbian President Slobodan Milošević resigned in October 2000, Dobroshi quit her job at the refugee camp and became a translator for NATO.

Career
After the war period, she took roles in the local theaters and Albanian movies, as well as a leading role in the prize-winning German-Albanian production Magic Eye (2005), a film about the situation in Albania in 1997, when it was rocked by unrest.

Lorna's Silence
While in Sarajevo doing a play in Bosnian, Dobroshi came into contact with Luc and Jean-Piere Dardenne who offered her an open casting in Kosovo for Lorna's Silence. Two weeks after the casting, Dobroshi was called up by the Dardenne brothers, asking her to go to Belgium to do two scenes in French with Jérémie Renier and Fabrizio Rongione. After learning the two scenes phonetically and after finishing the two days of shooting, she was given the role. She mastered the French language in an eight-week period before shooting.

Dobroshi came to international prominence in the Dardenne brothers' film Lorna's Silence in which she played the title role to great acclaim and received international media attention. The film was awarded in Cannes 2008. In the same year Dobroshi was nominated for her role, in the Best Actress category, at the European Film Awards and at the Toronto Film Critics Association Awards 2009.

"Lorna's Silence is her fourth feature and it meant a big jump in her career. International fame and acclamation came altogether, and that gave her global attention".

Dobroshi received high praise from the film industry press:

Baby
Dobroshi starred in the short film Baby by BAFTA winning director Daniel Mulloy. Baby won the Best Short Film Award when it premièred at the Edinburgh International Film Festival 2010 and won Best International Short Film at Cork Film Festival. It was awarded the highly coveted Best Short Film Award at the British Independent Film Awards Best International Short Film at Flickerfest and will have its US premiere at the Sundance Film Festival 2011. Dobroshi was awarded Best Actress for her role in Baby at the 24fps International Short Film Festival

Current works
Dobroshi has completed filming on Julie Gavras' Late Bloomers alongside William Hurt and Isabella Rossellini.

Dobroshi stars in Trois Mondes which had its première in the 2012 Cannes Film Festival.

Dobroshi is working on Nëna, with her director from Baby, Daniel Mulloy. The film is set in Kosovo's capital Pristina. Nëna will see Arta Dobroshi accept her first role on her home soil for many years. The film, financed by the UNDP, will be shot in the Albanian language and is the first project that Dobroshi will join as producer.

Other work
Dobroshi was a jury member of the 59th Berlin International Film Festival.

On 22 December 2008, Dobroshi was appointed by the United Nations Development Programme (UNDP) as a MDG Champion / Goodwill Ambassador for Kosovo. The UNDP were impressed by her previous charity work and believed that her high-profile would help raise awareness on issues.

Dobroshi won the 2017 BAFTA Film Award for producing the refugee film Home.

In 2016, Dobroshi was the lead in the acclaimed Massive Attack video Come Near Me.

Upon receiving the 2017 Gold Lion in Cannes Lions International Festival of Creativity Dobroshi broke protocol to give a powerful message to the world "I am Arta Dobroshi, my nationality is happy and I live in the city called earth".

Filmography

Personal life
Dobroshi can speak Albanian, English, French, and can understand Macedonian.

Awards
Shooting Stars Award (2013)  — at the Berlin International Film Festival
Berlin Film Festival (2013) — European Film Shooting Star by European Film Promotion
 Women's International Film and Television Showcase LA 2012, Best Actress Award
 European Film Award 2008, Nomination as Best Actress
 Toronto Film Critics Association Awards 2009, Nomination as Best Actress
 Skopje International Film Festival, Best Actress

Notes

References

External links
 
 Kirchner, Stephanie (2 March 2009) "Kosovo to Cannes: Arta Dobroshi's Journey to The Silence of Lorna". Time
 Maher, Kevin (20 November 2008). "Arta Dobroshi: from Kosovo with grim determination". The Times.
 Shoji, Kaori (23 January 2009). "Arta Dobroshi: A role model". The Japan Times
 "Kosovo-born actress Arta Dobroshi nominated MDG Champion". United Nations Development Programme Kosovo. (22 December 2008).
 Bramble, James "Arta Dobroshi". Little White Lies.
 Reynaert, Matthieu (14 July 2008). "interview with Arta Dobroshi • Actress". Cineuropa.

1980 births
Living people
Kosovan actresses
Albanian actresses
21st-century Albanian actresses
Yugoslav film actresses
Kosovan film producers
Albanian film producers